Lingshan may refer to:

Settlements in the People's Republic of China
County (灵山县)
Lingshan County, Qinzhou, Guangxi

Subdistricts (灵山街道)
Lingshan Subdistrict, Qi County, Hebi
Lingshan Subdistrict, Anshan, in Lishan District, Anshan, Liaoning

Towns (灵山镇)
Lingshan, Rong County, Guangxi, in Rong County, Guangxi
Lingshan, Hainan
Lingshan, Hebei
Lingshan, Luoshan County
Lingshan, Shandong, in Jimo City

Township (灵山乡)
Lingshan Township, Wangkui County, Heilongjiang

Village (灵山村)
Lingshan, Meichuan, Wuxue, Huanggang, Hubei

Others
Soul Mountain (靈山/灵山), a 1989 novel by Nobel-prize winner Gao Xingjian